Cui Zi'en, born 1958, in Harbin in the People's Republic of China, is a film director, producer, film scholar, screenwriter, novelist and an outspoken LGBT activist based in Beijing. He graduated from the Chinese Academy of Social Sciences with an MA in literature and now is an associate professor at the Film Research Institute of the Beijing Film Academy.

Cui Zi'en is one of the avant-garde DV makers in Chinese underground film. He has published nine novels in China and Hong Kong, one of which, Uncle's Past, won the 2001 Radio Literature Award in Germany. In the same year, he founded the Beijing Queer Film Festival, the first LGBT film festival in mainland China. He is also the author of books on criticism and theory, as well as a columnist for magazines.

Recognition
In 2002, the International Gay and Lesbian Human Rights Commission (IGLHRC) presented the Felipa de Souza Award to Cui Zi'en.

Cui brought issues of same-sex love into Chinese culture and public awareness, with a prolific crop of critically acclaimed articles, lectures, books, and films, including the first gay novel in modern China. Despite it being banned in mainland China, the novel is still available through unofficial channels.

Filmography

See also

 Homosexuality in China

Other Chinese LGBT film directors

 Simon Chung
 Kit Hung
 Stanley Kwan
 Quentin Lee
 Zihan Loo
 Scud
 Yonfan

References 

 Mtime , retrieved 10-03-2009

External links
 Felipa Award
 

Living people
Chinese film producers
Chinese male film actors
Screenwriters from Heilongjiang
Film directors from Heilongjiang
LGBT film directors
Hong Kong LGBT screenwriters
Hong Kong LGBT novelists
People's Republic of China LGBT people
Chinese LGBT rights activists
Male actors from Harbin
Male actors from Heilongjiang
Writers from Harbin
1958 births
Chinese male novelists
Educators from Heilongjiang
Felipa de Souza Award
21st-century Chinese LGBT people